The ninth series of Acapulco Shore, a Mexican television programme based in Acapulco was confirmed during the broadcast of one of the episodes of sideshow Acapulco Shock while the previous series aired in 2021. This series was filmed in Colombia throughout September 2021. This series will premiere on January 18, 2022, airing on MTVLA with episodes dropping on Paramount+ the same day.

This series cast and premiere date were announced on December 14, 2021, during that night's broadcast of La Venganza de los Ex VIP. Returning cast member Beni Falcón, and Rocío Sánchez. Debuting this season are Carlos Pantoja, José Rodríguez, Nati Peláez and Santiago Santana. Several guests will be featured in this series, are new cast members Andrés Altafulla, Kelly Reales, Kelly Medanie and María Fletcher.

Charlotte Caniggia and Ignacia Michelson were both confirmed and set to comeback this season as main cast members but for unknown reasons, Caniggia did not appear this season and Michelson arrived in Colombia but left prior to filming due to her father’s health condition. None of the rookies from this season returned for the tenth season.

Cast 

 Alba Zepeda
 Andrés Altafulla (Episodes 4–14)
 Beni Falcón
 Carlos Pantoja
 Diego Garciasela (Episodes 1–6)
 Eduardo "Chile" Miranda
 Fernanda Moreno 
 Isabel "Isa" Castro 
 Jacky Ramírez
 Jaylin Castellanos 
 Jibranne "Jey" Bazán (Episodes 9–12)
 José Rodríguez
 Kelly "Red" Medanie (Episodes 8–10)
 Kelly Reales (Episodes 7–10)
 María Fletcher (Episodes 10–13)
 Karime Pindter
 Nati Peláez
 Rocío Sánchez (Episodes 4–14)
 Santiago Santana (Episodes 2–14)

Duration of cast 

 = Cast member is featured in this episode.
 = Cast member arrives in the house.
 = Cast member leaves the series.
 = Cast member returns to the house.
 = Cast member returns to the series.
 = Cast member does not feature in this episode.
 = "Cast member" is not a cast member in this episode.

Episodes 
Note: Some episode titles have been adpated to a more understandable English translation

References

Jersey Shore (TV series)
Mexican reality television series
2022 Mexican television seasons